Bilzerian is a surname. Notable people with the surname include:

Adam Bilzerian (born 1983), Saint Kitts and Nevis poker player and writer
Dan Bilzerian (born 1980), American venture capitalist and professional poker player
Paul Bilzerian (born 1950), American financier